See also List of bridges in New Mexico
This is a list of bridges and tunnels on the National Register of Historic Places in the U.S. state of New Mexico.

See also
List of bridges in New Mexico

References

 
New Mexico
Bridges on the National Register of Historic Places
Bridges on the National Register of Historic Places